Asine may refer to:

 Asine, an ancient Greek city in Argolis
 Asine (Messenia), an ancient Greek city in Messenia
 Asine (Laconia), an ancient Greek city in Laconia
 Asini, a village in Argolis, Greece
 Theodorus of Asine, an ancient Greek philosopher
  Asine; Crusader name for Asira ash-Shamaliya